Hoffelt is a small village in the commune of Wincrange, in northern Luxembourg.  , the town had a population of 252.

Towns in Luxembourg
Wincrange